Durtum (also Romanized as Dūrtūm) is a village in Ashar Rural District, Ashar District, Mehrestan County, Sistan and Baluchestan Province, Iran. At the 2006 census, its population was 28, in 6 families.

References 

Populated places in Mehrestan County